WXBP (90.3 FM) is a Catholic talk radio station licensed to serve Corinth, Maine, United States. The station is an affiliate of Relevant Radio and is owned by Relevant Radio, Inc. The station signed on during the winter of 2011 as a simulcast of WXTP in Portland. The station is also heard in the Augusta area on WWTP and in the Brunswick/Bath area on WTBP.

References

External links
 

Relevant Radio stations
Catholic radio stations
Mass media in Penobscot County, Maine
Radio stations established in 2011
XBP